Wawea is a genus of lichenized fungi within the Arctomiaceae family. This is a monotypic genus, containing the single species Wawea fruticulosa.

References

Lecanorales
Lichen genera
Monotypic Lecanorales genera
Taxa named by Aino Henssen
Taxa named by Gintaras Kantvilas
Taxa described in 1985